Methods-Time Measurement (MTM) is a predetermined motion time system that is used primarily in industrial settings to analyze the methods used to perform any manual operation or task and, as a product of that analysis, set the standard time in which a worker should complete that task.

MTM was released in 1948 and today exist in several variations, known as MTM-1, MTM-2, MTM-UAS, MTM-MEK and MTM-SAM. Some MTM standards are obsolete; including MTM-3 and MMMM (4M).

History

The basic MTM data was developed by H.B. Maynard, JL Schwab and GJ Stegemerten of the Methods Engineering Council during a consultancy assignment at the Westinghouse Brake and Signal Corporation, United States in the 1940s. This data and the application rules for the MTM system were refined, extended, defined, industrially tested and documented as a result of further work in later years.

In 1948, Maynard, Stegemerten and Schwab published the book “Methods-Time Measurement” giving full details of the development of the MTM system and its application rules. The use of Methods-Time Measurement MTM spread, firstly in the USA and then to other industrialized countries. In 1951 the USA / Canada MTM Association for Standards and Research was formed by MTM Users. The system originators then assigned the MTM copyrights to the MTM Association. Other national MTM Associations were founded and, at a meeting in Paris in 1957, it was decided to form an International MTM Directorate (IMD) to co-ordinate the work of National Associations. National MTM Association members of IMD now hold the MTM copyrights for their territorial areas. 

In 2020 IMD was terminated and dissolved. A new non profit organisation, IMD-EWD was founded by MTM associations Nordic, France, Spain, Turkey and Switzerland. IMD-EWD (International Motion Time Measurement - Ethical Work Design) continue to cover, prove, develop and certify all training materials for MTM techniques.

Other MTM based systems have since been developed. MTM-2, a second generation system was developed under IMD auspices in 1965; MTM–3, a further simplification, was developed in 1970. The original MTM system is now commonly referred to as MTM-1. Other systems based on MTM have been developed for particular work areas by National Associations. The most recent development is MTM-UAS, created by a consortium from the German, Swiss and Austrian National Associations during the mid 1970s.
1975 The Nordic MTM Association developed and launched MTM-SAM, the third generation of MTM technique.

Methodology

Films were taken using constant speed cameras, running at 16 frames per second, of the work performed by qualified workers on the shop floor at the Westinghouse Brake and Signal Corporation. Each sequence was rated during filming by three qualified Industrial Engineers. These ratings had to agree within a close band, otherwise the sequence was not used.

The rating, or Levelling, system used was the Westinghouse or LMS system – so called after its originators Lowry, Maynard and Stegemerten. This system considers four factors independently:
Skill – Proficiency in following the given method
Effort – The will to work
Conditions – The general work surroundings
Consistency – of performance

Each factor is assigned an alpha rating, e.g. “B-“, “C+”, “A”, etc. which has a numeric value which is applied later. This reduces the possibility of “clock rating” and ensures that all factors are considered in the composite rating. Appendix 1 shows the model for Causes of Difference in Output on which the LMS system is based.

Layout, distances, sizes of parts and tools and tolerances were accurately measured and recorded on the shop floor to complement the later analyses.

The films were then projected frame-by-frame and analysed and classified in to a predetermined format of Basic Motions. These Basic Motions were Reach, Grasp, Move, Position, Release, etc. A motion was taken to begin on the frame in which the hand first started performing the motion and was taken to end on the frame in which the motion was completed. This allowed a time for each recorded motion to be calculated in seconds, by means of a frame count, and then “levelled” to a common performance.

Plots of the levelled times for the various motions were drawn. Analysis determined the best definitions of limits of motions and their major, time-determining variables, and resulted in, more or less, the structure which the manual motions of MTM-1 have today. Later work, using Time Study, gave the table of Body Motions.

In 1949, Cornell University conducted an independent study of MTM for the American Society of Mechanical Engineers. It used camera speeds of 64fps. The MTM data was replicated within very close limits. Minor discrepancies revealed by the faster camera speeds have since been corrected in the MTM-1 data.

Detailed research conducted under the auspices of the USA / Canada MTM Association have resulted in minor changes to the data and the application rules and in a greater understanding of the nature of the motions. The last change was made to the detail of the Apply Pressure data in 1973. 

Many contributions were developed in the area of MTM, more recently 2019-2020, a team from University of Pisa collaborated with an Italian company developed an automated system called Method Time Measurement 4.0 (MTM4.0) aligning with Industry 4.0 concepts and enabling technologies such as Industrial Internet of Things (IIoT) and Radio Frequency IDentification (RFID), the work of the team is published in International Journal of Productivity and Performance Management.

MTM is complementary to other Industrial Engineering charting analytical techniques; it does not replace them. It should be used after broader techniques have established the Necessity and Purpose, Place, Sequence, Person and Means of the tasks to be evaluated.

Unit
The unit in which movements are measured for MTM is TMU (time measurement unit): 1 TMU = 36 milliseconds ; 1 hour = 100,000 TMU

1 TMU = 0.036 second

See also
 Predetermined motion time system

References
 Karger, Delmar W. & Bayha, Franklin H. Engineered Work Measurement, Fourth Edition. Industrial Press. 
 MTM-1 Analyst Manual. UK MTMA (2000) Ltd
 Miller, Doug, Towards Sustainable Labour Costing in UK Fashion Retail (February 5, 2013). 
 Fantoni, G., Al-Zubaidi, S.Q., Coli, E. and Mazzei, D. (2020), "Automating the process of method-time-measurement", International Journal of Productivity and Performance Management, Vol. ahead-of-print No. ahead-of-print. https://doi.org/10.1108/IJPPM-08-2019-0404

Time and motion study